SK Imavere  is a football club, based in Imavere, Estonia.

The club also has a reserve team, JK Väätsa Vald, which plays in the III Liiga.

Players

Current squad

Statistics

League and Cup

References

Association football clubs established in 2012
Järva County
2012 establishments in Estonia
Football clubs in Estonia